Rupert Thomas David Benstead (5 June 1889 – 17 November 1961) was an Australian rules footballer who played with Essendon in the Victorian Football League (VFL).

Notes

External links 

1889 births
1961 deaths
Australian rules footballers from Victoria (Australia)
Essendon Football Club players